Avianca Flight 671, registration HK-177, was a Lockheed Constellation that crashed and burned on landing at Montego Bay, Jamaica, on 21 January 1960. It was and remains the worst accident in Jamaican aviation history.

The flight had originated at Miami International Airport, Florida. The aircraft operating the flight was a Lockheed L-1049E Super Constellation used by Avianca for its Bogota-Montego Bay routes. Thirty-seven of the 46 passengers and crew aboard were killed.

Accident
On landing, the plane made a heavy touchdown, bounced, and landed back on the runway, then skidded down the runway in flames. It came to rest upside down, 1900 feet from the runway threshold and 200 feet to the left thereof.

References

Accidents and incidents involving the Lockheed Constellation
Avianca accidents and incidents
Aviation accidents and incidents in 1960
Aviation accidents and incidents in Jamaica
1960 in Jamaica
January 1960 events in North America